A college tour, also called a campus tour, is a tour of a college or university's campus. Prospective students, their family members and other visitors take campus tours to learn about the college or university's facilities, as well as student life, culture on campus, academics, and programs offered by the institution. During these tours, prospective students are able to learn about the built environment and the overall look and feel of the institution. College tours may be taken individually or by school groups and educational programs as a way for many people to visit several schools over a short period of time. In addition, many colleges now offer virtual tours on the Internet.

Campus visit

In most cases a campus visit involves an information session directed by an admissions officer and a walking tour of campus conducted by a student ambassador. A campus visit can be taken by individual students and their families. Many colleges offer “open houses” usually consisting of a day or series of days set aside for students and their families to visit a particular school. Often there will be special programs or presentations during these times which would not be available during a regular visit. Most colleges and universities also offer private tours and information sessions for large groups from a single school or educational program.

Some schools provide overnight accommodation and meals, and students may sit-in on a class during their visit. Some programs pair a prospective student with a current student and allow the prospective student to shadow the current student for a day.

Information session
An admissions information session provides prospective students with knowledge about the college they are applying to. These sessions include information about admissions requirements, financial aid, and academic requirements for acceptance to that particular institution.

Sample campus visit

Other types of tours
 Online photographic tour
 Self-guided tour
 Podcast tour

See also
 College admissions in the United States
 Transfer admissions in the United States

References

University and college admissions
Academic culture
Academic terminology
Types of travel